The teams competing in Group 8 of the 2006 UEFA European Under-21 Championship qualifying competition were Sweden, Bulgaria, Hungary, Croatia, Iceland and Malta.

Standings

Matches
All times are CET.

Goalscorers
6 goals
 Hannes Sigurðsson

5 goals
 Eduardo da Silva

4 goals
 Alexander Farnerud

3 goals

 Josip Tadić
 Tibor Tisza
 Mikael Dahlberg

2 goals

 Valeri Domovchiyski
 József Magasföldi
 Garðar Gunnlaugsson
 Emil Hallfreðsson
 Hördur Sveinsson
 Henok Goitom
 Jon Jönsson

1 goal

 Tsvetan Genkov
 Adrian Olegov
 Todor Palankov
 Dimitar Rangelov
 Mihail Venkov
 Gerasim Zakov
 Mladen Bartulović
 Tomislav Bušić
 Mario Grgurović
 Luka Modrić
 Karlo Primorac
 Neven Vukman
 Róbert Feczesin
 Péter Máté
 György Sándor
 Krisztián Vadócz
 Vilmos Vanczák
 Tamás Vaskó
 Ingvi Rafn Gudmundsson
 Davíð Viðarsson
 Pálmi Rafn Pálmason
 Cleavon Frendo
 André Schembri
 Dennis Jonsson
 Jonas Olsson
 Björn Runström
 Fredrik Stenman

1 own goal

 Zhivko Milanov (playing against Malta)
 Hannes Sigurðsson (playing against Bulgaria)
 Trevor Cilia (playing against Sweden)
 Shawn Tellus (playing against Hungary)

External links
 Group 8 at UEFA.com

Group 8
Under
Under
Under